The Hard Way is the third studio album by American country music singer Clint Black. It was released on July 14, 1992 and he co-produced the album with James Stroud.

It includes the Billboard Hot Country Singles & Tracks top-ten hits "We Tell Ourselves"[#2], "Burn One Down"[#4], and the number-one hit "When My Ship Comes In". While not as commercially successful as his first two albums, The Hard Way was certified platinum by the RIAA.

Track listing

Personnel

Band 
Eddie Bayers — drums
Clint Black — harmonica, electric guitar, acoustic guitar, lead vocals, background vocals
Larry Byrom — acoustic guitar
Lenny Castro — percussion
Eric Darken — percussion
Jerry Douglas — Dobro
Sonny Garrish — steel guitar
Dick Gay — drums
Rob Hajacos — fiddle
Dann Huff — electric guitar
Jeff Huskins — fiddle
Jana King — background vocals
Liana Manis — background vocals
Hayden Nicholas — electric guitar, electric sitar
Mark O'Connor — fiddle
Jeff Peterson — steel guitar
Don Potter — acoustic guitar
Matt Rollings — piano
Leland Sklar — bass guitar
Jake Willemain — bass guitar
Dennis Wilson — background vocals
Curtis Young — background vocals
Martin Young — acoustic guitar
Reggie Young — electric guitar

Production 

Clint Black — producer
James Stroud — producer
Lynn Peterzell — engineer

Chart performance

Album

Singles

References 

The Hard Way [CD liner notes]. 1992. RCA Records.
[ Artist Chart History (Singles)]. Billboard. Retrieved on January 1, 2007.
[ Artist Chart History (Albums)]. Billboard. Retrieved on January 1, 2007.

1992 albums
Clint Black albums
RCA Records albums
Albums produced by James Stroud
Albums produced by Clint Black